Classmates is a 1914 silent film directed by James Kirkwood for the Biograph Company. It is based on the 1907 stage play Classmates by Margaret Turnbull and William C. deMille. It was shot in Jacksonville, Florida at the end of 1913.

The film is extant today as the result of a paper print in the Library of Congress. It was shown at Cinefest 2012.

Cast
Blanche Sweet – Sylvia Randolph
Henry B. Walthall – Duncan Irving
Marshall Neilan – Bert Stafford
Gertrude Robinson – Phyllis Stafford
Augusta Anderson – Mrs. Stafford
Lionel Barrymore – Dumble
Thomas Jefferson – Mr. Irving

unbilled
Dorothy Bernard – Bit
Jack Mulhall – Man

See also
Blanche Sweet filmography
Lionel Barrymore filmography

References

External links

1914 films
American silent short films
American black-and-white films
Biograph Company films
American films based on plays
Silent American drama films
1914 drama films
1914 short films
Films directed by James Kirkwood Sr.
1910s American films